Michael Biehn is an American actor, primarily known for his military roles in science fiction films directed by James Cameron; as Sgt. Kyle Reese in The Terminator (1984) and its sequel Terminator 2: Judgment Day (1991) (although he only appeared in Director's cut on Terminator 2), Cpl. Dwayne Hicks in Aliens (1986), and Lt. Coffey in The Abyss (1989). His other films include The Fan (1981), Navy SEALs (1990), Tombstone (1993), The Rock (1996), Megiddo: The Omega Code 2 (2001), and Planet Terror (2007). On television, he has appeared in Hill Street Blues (1984) and Adventure Inc. (2002–2003). Biehn received a Best Actor Saturn Award nomination for Aliens, and received The Life Career Award at the 2011 ceremony.

Film

Television

Video games

References

Male actor filmographies
American filmographies